Andabotoka is a town and commune in western Madagascar. It belongs to the district of Maintirano, which is a part of Melaky Region. The population of the commune was estimated to be approximately 5,000 in 2001 commune census.

Only primary schooling is available. The majority 85% of the population of the commune are farmers, while an additional 13% receives their livelihood from raising livestock. The most important crop is rice, while other important products are wheat, maize and cassava.  Services provide employment for 2% of the population.

References and notes 

Populated places in Melaky